Summit Partners is an American private equity firm based in Boston, Massachusetts. The firm focuses on investing in technology, healthcare, life sciences and other growth industries.

Background 
Summit Partners was founded in 1984 by Roe Stamps and Stephen Woodsum, who previously worked together at TA Associates. Greg Avis would also join as a co-founder shortly after. The firm is considered one of the earliest private equity firms to focus on growth investing.

In 2000, the three co-founders handed over daily management of the firm to five partners.

In 2015, the firm acquired Alydar Capital. It now operates as the public equity investment arm of Summit Partners.

Summit Partners is headquartered in Boston with additional offices in Menlo Park, London and Luxembourg.

Business Overview 
Summit Partners has three main business lines, which are:

 Growth & Venture 
 Credit 
 Public Equity

The firm typically invests in later-stage companies that have already been established with the objective of providing further growth. Its private equity investments typically range from $30 million to $500 million each, while its venture capital investments range from $5 million to $30 million each. The firm also provides debt financing as well as public equities' investment services.

Notable investments made by Summit Partners include Uber, McAfee, Avast, Infor, Flow Traders and Arista Networks.

Funds

Growth

Venture

Credit

Subordinated Debt

Notable investments 

 A Cloud Guru
 Aeryon Labs
 Akeneo
 Answers.com
 Arista Networks
 Avast
 AvePoint
 AvidXchange
 Belkin
 Bigpoint
 Brightside
 Calypso Technology
 Clarabridge
 CrossFit
 Darktrace
 Everi Holdings
 Fleetcor
Flow Traders
 Funding Circle
 Fuze
 Healthline
 Infor
 Ingenico
 Integrated DNA Technologies
 Jamf
 Jumia Group
 Lazada Group
 Liquidnet
 Logi Analytics
 M/A-COM
 Markforged
 Masternaut
 McAfee
 Morphe Cosmetics
 Mozio
 Perforce
 Philz Coffee
 Podium
 Postini
 Reverb.com
 RiskIQ
 Signavio
 Siteimprove
 Smartsheet Inc.
 Syncron
 Tippmann
 TSheets
 Uber
 Veepee
 Welltec
 Wildfire Interactive
 Zalora Group
 Zenoss Core

References

External links
 www.summitpartners.com (Company Website)

Financial services companies established in 1984
Financial services companies based in Massachusetts
Companies based in Boston
Private equity firms of the United States
Venture capital firms of the United States